Belmont railway station is a name shared by a number of transit stations around the world, and may refer to:

Australia
 Belmont railway station, New South Wales
 Redcliffe railway station in Perth, formerly proposed to be called Belmont railway station
 Belmont Park railway station, Perth, Western Australia

New Zealand
 Belmont Railway Station, New Zealand

Switzerland
 Belmont-sur-Montreux railway station

United Kingdom
 Belmont railway station (Harrow), England
 Belmont railway station (Sutton), England
 Belmont Junction railway station (Durham), England

United States
 Belmont station (Caltrain), Belmont, California
 Belmont station (CTA Blue Line), Chicago, Illinois
 Belmont station (CTA North Side Main Line), Chicago, Illinois
 Belmont station (Metra), Downers Grove, Illinois
 Belmont Center station, Belmont, Massachusetts
 Belmont Park (LIRR station), Queens, New York

See also
Belmont transmitting station, Lincolnshire, England 
Belmont (disambiguation)